Alexander Ypsilantis ( Alexandros Ypsilantis, ; 1726 – 13 January 1807) was a Greek Voivode (Prince) of Wallachia from 1774 to 1782, and again from 1796 to 1797, and also Voivode of Moldavia from 1786 to 1788. He bears the same name as, but should not be confused with, his grandson, the Greek War of Independence hero of the early 19th century. The Ypsilantis were a prominent family of Phanariotes.

Reign

In 1774, as a diplomat in service to the Porte, Ypsilanti took part in the signing of the Treaty of Kuchuk-Kainarji with Russia; a year later, he was rewarded for this and other services by being appointed Dragoman of the Porte. Still in 1775, he was awarded the throne of Wallachia. This could only happen as the Russian troops were ending their occupation of Bucharest, begun in 1771. The throne had been vacant throughout this period, a hiatus provoked by Emanuel Giani Ruset's agreement with Catherine II at the start of the war.

As principal acts of his reign in Wallachia, Ypsilanti enforced a series of reforms. Several laws are grouped in the Pravilniceasca condică, called "Syntagmation nomikon" in its Greek version (roughly: "The Code of Byzantine customary laws"). Issued in 1780, the Code sought to amend fiscal, administrative, judicial and political flaws. During his judicial reform, Ipsilanti created civil courts in each Wallachian county. What was in fact a radical redefinition of legal boundaries had to make occasional reference to Byzantine norms (the traditional laws in the two Principalities), due to resistance from conservative boyars in the Assembly (the Sfat). Most notably, the new laws tried to impose salaries for public offices, a measure intended to reduce fiscal burdens on the taxed social categories (that had been supposed to provide revenues for the fiscal agents, usually boyars, in an economy in which land ownership had become less of an asset than holding office) and ensure a more professional administrative structure.

Ypsilanti's reigns coincide with a critical moment in Ottoman history. In August 1787, Russia resumed hostilities (see Russo-Turkish War (1787–1792)), and the Porte faced a large-scale invasion of its Danubian territories as the Habsburg Empire joined the fighting (9 February 1788). A secondary effect of this event was the granting of military command over Turkish troops in the region to Ypsilanti: the gesture is also significant as a temporary re-shaping of status in the relations between Prince and Sultan for the context of Phanariote rule.

Sources suggest that Ypsilanti was considering an alliance with Austria, and had been negotiating with emissaries of Emperor Joseph II. However, as the Austrians occupied Iaşi in April, all contacts ceased and the Prince was kept in custody in Brno up to the signing of the peace treaty at Sistowa (autumn of 1791).

See also
 Constantine Ypsilantis – son
 Alexander Ypsilantis – grandson
 Demetrios Ypsilantis – grandson

References

Sources
 Vlad Georgescu, Istoria ideilor politice româneşti (1369–1878), Munich, 1987 
 Mustafa A. Mehmet, Documente turceşti privind istoria României, vol. III, Bucharest, 1983 
 Neagu Djuvara, Între Orient şi Occident – Ţările Române la începutul epocii moderne, Editura Humanitas, Bucharest, 2007

Dragomans of the Porte
Rulers of Moldavia
Rulers of Wallachia
Alexander
1725 births
1805 deaths
Rulers of Moldavia and Wallachia
18th-century translators
Diplomats from Istanbul
Constantinopolitan Greeks